Osipovka is a rural locality (a selo) and the administrative centre of Oktyabrsky Selsoviet, Blagoveshchensky District, Bashkortostan, Russia. The population was 364 as of 2010. There are 7 streets.

Geography 
Osipovka is located 72 km northeast of Blagoveshchensk (the district's administrative centre) by road. Usabash is the nearest rural locality.

References 

Rural localities in Blagoveshchensky District